The men's lightweight event was part of the boxing programme at the 1988 Summer Olympics. The weight class allowed boxers of up to 60 kilograms to compete. The competition was held from 19 September to 1 October 1988. 39 boxers from 39 nations competed. Andreas Zülow won the gold medal.

Medalists

Results
The following boxers took part in the event:

First round
 Azzedine Said (ALG) def. Lameck Mbao (ZAM), KO-2
 Mohamed Regazy (EGY) def. Dal Bahadur Ranamagar (NEP), 5:0
 Blessing Onoko (NGA) def. Charles Lubulwa (UGA), RSC-3
 Giorgio Campanella (ITA) def. Daniel Freitas (URU), RSC-3
 Andreas Zülow (GDR) def. Patrick Waweru (KEN), 5:0
 Konstantin Tszyu (URS) def. Leopoldo Cantancio (PHI), KO-1
 Sean Knight (BRB) def. Guillermo Tamez (MEX), 5:0

Second round
 Michael Carruth (IRL) def. Satoru Higashi (JPN), 5:0
 George Cramne (SWE) def. John Nkagala (MLW), 5:0
 Phat Hongram (THA) def. Asif Dar (CAN), RSC-2
 Charles Kane (GBR) def. Adrian Taroreh (INA), 5:0
 István Turu (HUN) def. Jean-Paul Bonatou (CMR), 5:0
 Nergüin Enkhbat (MGL) def. José Pérez (VEN), 5:0
 Héctor Arroyo (PUR) def. Kibar Tatar (TUR), 5:0
 Kamal Marjouane (MAR) def. Tommy Gbay (LBR) 5:0
 Romallis Ellis (USA) def. Lee Kang-Su (KOR), 5:0
 Kassim Traoré (MLI) def. Tobi Pelly (SUD), 5:0
 Mark Kennedy (JAM) def. Terepai Maea (CIS), RSC-1
 Emil Chuprenski (BUL) def. Eduardo de la Peña (GUA), RSC-2
 Azzedine Said (ALG) def. Shake Kubuitsile (BTS), RSC-2
 Mohamed Regazy (EGY) def. Blessing Onoko (NGA), 5:0
 Andreas Zülow (GDR) def. Giorgio Campanella (ITA), 5:0
 Konstantin Tszyu (URS) def. Sean Knight (BRB), RSC-1

Third round
 George Cramne (SWE) def. Michael Carruth (IRL), KO-1
 Charles Kane (GBR) def. Phat Hongram (THA), 4:1
 Nergüin Enkhbat (MGL) def. István Turu (HUN), RSC-3
 Kamal Marjouane (MAR) def. Héctor Arroyo (PUR), 5:0
 Romallis Ellis (USA) def. Kassim Traoré (MLI), RSC-2
 Emil Chuprenski (BUL) def. Mark Kennedy (JAM), 5:0
 Mohamed Regazy (EGY) def. Azzedine Said (ALG), 5:0
 Andreas Zülow (GDR) def. Konstantin Tszyu (URS), 3:2

Quarterfinals
 George Cramne (SWE) def. Charles Kane (GBR), 4:1
 Nergüin Enkhbat (MGL) def. Kamal Marjouane (MAR), 5:0
 Romallis Ellis (USA) def. Emil Chuprenski (BUL), 3:2
 Andreas Zülow (GDR) def. Mohamed Regazy (EGY), 5:0

Semifinals
 George Cramne (SWE) def. Nergüin Enkhbat (MGL), 3:2
 Andreas Zülow (GDR) def. Romallis Ellis (USA), 5:0

Final
 Andreas Zülow (GDR) def. George Cramne (SWE), 5:0

References

Lightweight